Suzan-Lori Parks (born May 10, 1963) is an American playwright, screenwriter, musician and novelist. Her 2001 play Topdog/Underdog won the Pulitzer Prize for Drama in 2002; Parks was the first African-American woman to receive the award for drama.

Early life and education

Parks was born in Fort Knox, Kentucky. She grew up with two siblings in a military family. Parks enjoyed writing poems and songs and created a newspaper with her brother, called the "Daily Daily." Parks was raised Catholic and attended high school in West Germany, where her father, a career officer in the United States Army, was stationed. The experience showed her "what it feels like to be neither white nor black, but simply foreign". After returning to the U.S., Parks's family relocated frequently and she attended school in Kentucky, Texas, California, North Carolina, Maryland, and Vermont. She graduated high school from The John Carroll School in 1981 while her father was stationed in Aberdeen Proving Ground.

In high school, Parks was discouraged from studying literature by at least one teacher, but upon reading Virginia Woolf's To the Lighthouse, Parks found herself veering away from her interest in chemistry, gravitating towards writing. Parks attended Mount Holyoke College and became a member of Phi Beta Kappa. She graduated in 1985 with a B.A. in English and German literature. She studied under James Baldwin, who encouraged her to become a playwright; Parks was initially resistant to writing for theater, believing that it was "where a lot of people with too much attitude wore funny clothes and funny little costumes, and they talked with funny little voices even though they were from, like, New York or New Jersey. And I didn't respect that." Parks began to take classes with Baldwin and, at his behest, began to write plays. Baldwin later described Parks as, "an utterly astounding and beautiful creature who may become one of the most valuable artists of our time." Parks then studied acting for a year at Drama Studio London.

Parks also noted that she was inspired by Wendy Wasserstein, a 1971 Mount Holyoke graduate who won the Pulitzer in 1989 for her play The Heidi Chronicles. Parks also credited another Mount Holyoke professor, Leah Blatt Glasser, with her success.

Career
Parks has written three screenplays and numerous stage-plays. Her first screenplay was for Spike Lee's 1996 film Girl 6. She later worked with Oprah Winfrey's Harpo Productions on screenplays for Their Eyes Were Watching God (2005) and The Great Debaters (2007).

Parks became the first female African-American to receive the Pulitzer Prize, which was awarded in 2002 for her play Topdog/Underdog. She has also received a number of grants including the MacArthur Foundation "Genius" Grant in 2001. She is a winner of the 2017 Poets, Essayists and Novelists (PEN) America Literary Awards in the category Master American Dramatist. She received the 2018 Steinberg Distinguished Playwright Award. This biennial award is given to "established playwrights whose body of work has made significant contributions to the American theatre."

Betting on the Dust Commander 
Although Betting on the Dust Commander was not the first play Parks wrote, it was the first of her plays to be produced. Her first play The Sinner's Place, which she wrote for her senior project at Mount Holyoke, was rejected for production by her college's drama department as they considered it too experimental since she wanted to have dirt on the stage during the performance. When her second play, Betting on the Dust Commander, first premiered, it ran for three nights in a bar in Manhattan's Lower East Side called Gas Station. It is a short, one-act play set in Kentucky, centering around the lives of a couple, Mare and Lucius, who have been married for 110 years. Parks's unique voice is displayed throughout the text via her use of specific dialect and incorporation of the sounds of sniffling and sneezing as part of the dialogue. The play's title comes from the horse that won the Kentucky Derby in 1970, Dust Commander. As the play goes on, we discover that Dust Commander's Derby is responsible for bringing Mare and Lucius together, and through the couple's discussion of him they think back over their many years of memories together. The motif of dust along with many of the play's lines are intentionally repeated throughout the text. In addition to this Parks does not give the audience any information on how these two characters have managed to live for so long. In this way she destabilizes any linear sense of memory and time. Parks complicates the audience's view of history, relationships, and the past; some argue that Parks's incorporation of these elements and the repetitive style of the text is reminiscent of African rituals and the way that their retelling of stories often incorporate the past in a literal manner.

Topdog/Underdog
One of her best-known works is Topdog/Underdog. This play marked a departure from the heightened language she usually wrote. Parks is an admirer of Abraham Lincoln and believed he left a legacy for descendants of slaves. Topdog/Underdog explains what that legacy is. It tells the story of two African-American brothers: Lincoln and Booth. Lincoln works at a boardwalk arcade, dressing up like Abraham Lincoln and letting the tourists shoot him with plastic guns. He got this job because he could be paid less than the white man who had the job before. Parks does not judge Lincoln in this play, but rather enjoys bringing him into the other characters' lives and seeing how they are affected. She said, "Lincoln is the closest thing we have to a mythic figure. In days of Greek drama, they had Apollo and Medea and Oedipus – these larger than life figures that walked the earth and spoke – and they turned them into plays. Shakespeare had kings and queens that he fashioned into his stories. Lincoln, to me, is one of those." Parks also believes that Lincoln "created an opening with that hole in his head." She makes the case that everything we do has to pass through everything else, like the eye of a needle. She says we have all passed through the hole in Lincoln's head on our journey to whatever lies ahead. Like many of her other plays, Topdog/Underdog takes her characters on a quest to find out who they are and to examine the stories and experiences that have shaped their lives. More than anything, she believes that we have an important relationship with the past.

365 Plays/365 Days
Parks decided that she wanted to give herself the task of writing 365 plays in 365 days, hence her play 365 Plays/365 Days. This decision was made shortly after one of her books, Getting Mother's Body, was published. She kept herself on schedule and succeeded. She wrote anywhere she had to: on the road, hotel rooms, and modes of transportation. The end result has been produced by more than 700 theaters around the world.

The plays were presented by 725 performing arts groups, taking turns until the entire cycle was performed. The performances started in 2006, and included venues such as the Denver Center Theatre Company, colleges in England and Australia and the Steel City Theatre Company in Pueblo, Colorado. Other venues were the Steppenwolf Theatre Company and the Goodman Theatre in Chicago, and the Center Theater Group in Los Angeles. The plays were presented at the Public Theater, New York City in November 2006, directed by Michael Greif.

Father Comes Home From the Wars, Parts 1, 2 & 3
Father Comes Home From the Wars, Parts 1, 2 & 3 premiered off-Broadway at the Public Theater in a developmental production in March 2014 and a full production that fall. Directed by Jo Bonney, the cast featured Sterling K. Brown, Louis Cancelmi, Peter Jay Fernandez, Russell G. Jones, and Jacob Ming-Trent. Jacob Ming-Trent won the 2015 Lucille Lortel Award for Outstanding Featured Actor in a Play and Parks won the 2015 Obie Award for playwriting presented by the American Theater Wing. The play, which takes place during the American Civil War, is presented in three parts: Part 1, A Measure of a Man; Part 2, The Battle in the Wilderness; and Part 3, The Union of My Confederate Parts.<ref>Hetrick, Adam. [http://www.playbill.com/article/suzan-lori-parks-father-comes-home-from-the-wars-extends-again-com-335607# "Suzan-Lori Parks Father Comes Home from the Wars' Extends Again"] Playbill, November 17, 2014</ref> From September 15 to October 22, 2016 the play had its London premiere at the Royal Court in a transfer of the Public Theatre production directed by Jo Bonney. The cast featured Steve Toussaint, Nadine Marshall, Leo Wringer, Sibusiso Mamba, Tom Bateman, and Jimmy Akingbola.

The play was a finalist for the 2015 Pulitzer Prize for Drama. The Pulitzer committee wrote: "A distinctive and lyrical epic about a slave during the Civil War that deftly takes on questions of identity, power and freedom with a blend of humor and dignity."

 The Red Letter Plays 
Two plays produced at the same time. Telling different stories with themes from The Scarlet Letter such as the ideas of sex, love, society, and power. The Red Letter Plays: Fucking A & In the Blood. Both plays have a mother named Hester struggling in a society where they put her in the role of outcast. Both mothers face difficult challenges brought on by power struggles, society, sexism, and love. The first play In the Blood premiered in 1999 following the story of a penniless mother of five. Hester is condemned by the men who once loved her. Hester is trying to help someone to make her children's lives better while living in poverty. She has a reputation in the town as a "slut" on her, which is affecting her chance at making a better life for her kids. Hester seizes the opportunity to receive help from her children's fathers, with hopes that one may help them. In the Blood was a finalist for the 2000 Pulitzer Prize for Drama. Originally Parks wanted to title 'In the Blood'  Fucking A. Later Parks writes Fucking A in 2000 which tells the story of Hester the abortionist trying to free her son from jail.

In 2017 Signature Theatre Company produced these two plays in the same season. Suzan-Lori Parks says "They were conceived from the same idea but until now have lived very separate lives. I can’t wait to participate in the dialogue that will come from witnessing these two works in concert." The two plays can be viewed separately and the audience member would get a whole picture but watched together displays Parks' work from over two decades ago create conversation with a new audience.

 Sally & Tom 
In October 2022, "Sally & Tom,” a new play about Thomas Jefferson and Sally Hemings began performances at the Guthrie Theater in Minneapolis.

 Plays for the Plague Year 
Plays for the Plague Year, described by the New York Times as "Parks’s diaristic musings on the first year of the Covid-19 pandemic and a coincident string of deaths, including those of Black Americans killed by police officers," was scheduled for a November 2022 premiere at Joe’s Pub, with Parks onstage singing and starring.

 The Harder They Come The Harder They Come, Parks' musical adaptation of the 1972 Jamaican reggae film was scheduled to be staged at the Public Theater in early 2023.

Works

Plays

 The Sinner's Place (1984)
 Betting on the Dust Commander (1987)
 Imperceptible Mutabilities in the Third Kingdom (1989)
 The Death of the Last Black Man in the Whole Entire World A.K.A. The Negro Book Of The Dead (1989–1992)
 Pickling (1990) (radio play)
 Third Kingdom (1990) (radio play)
 Locomotive (1991)  (radio play)
 Devotees in the Garden of Love (1992)
 The America Play (1994)
 Venus (1996)
 In The Blood (1999)
 Fucking A (2000)
 Topdog/Underdog (1999)
 365 Days/365 Plays (2002-2003)
 Unchain My Heart (The Ray Charles Musical) (2007)
 The Book of Grace (2010)
 Porgy and Bess (2011) (Book Adaptation)
 Father Comes Home from the Wars (Parts 1, 2, and 3) (2014)
 White Noise (2019) (Off-Broadway) (winner, 2019 Obie Award, Playwriting)

ScreenplaysGirl 6 (1996)Their Eyes Were Watching God (2005)Native Son (2019)The United States vs. Billie Holiday (2021)

Essays

 
 "An Equation for Black People Onstage." In The America Play and Other Works, 19–22. New York: Theatre Communications Group, 1995.
 "From the Elements of Style." In The America Play and Other Works, 6–18. New York: Theatre Communications Group, 1995.
 "Possession." In The America Play and Other Works, 3–5. New York: Theatre Communications Group, 1995.
 "Tradition and the Individual Talent." Theater 29.2 (1999): 26–33.

Novels
 

Recognition
 1990 Obie Award Best New American Play – Imperceptible Mutabilities in the Third Kingdom 1992 Whiting Award
 1995 Lila-Wallace Reader's Digest Award
 1996 Obie Award for Playwriting – Venus 2000 Guggenheim Fellowship Playwriting
 2000 Pulitzer Prize Drama finalist – In The Blood 2001 MacArthur Foundation "Genius" Grant
 2002 Pulitzer Prize for Drama – Topdog/Underdog 2002 Drama Desk Award Outstanding New Play nomination – Topdog/Underdog 2002 Tony Award for Best Play nomination – Topdog/Underdog 2006 Eugene McDermott Award in the Arts from the Council for the Arts at MIT (CAMIT)
 2007  Academy of Achievement Golden Plate Award
 2008 NAACP Theatre Award - Ray Charles Live! A New Musical 2015 Edward M. Kennedy Prize for Drama Inspired by American History - "Father Comes Home From the Wars, Parts 1, 2 & 3"
 2015 Dorothy and Lillian Gish Prize
 2015 Lucille Lortel Outstanding Play Award nomination - Father Comes Home From the Wars, Parts 1, 2 & 3 2015 Pulitzer Prize Drama finalist - Father Comes Home From the Wars, Parts 1, 2 & 3 2017 PEN/Laura Pels International Foundation for Theater Awards for Master American Dramatist
 2018 Windham–Campbell Literature Prize in Drama
 2019 Outer Critics Circle Award, Outstanding New Off-Broadway Play — White NoisePersonal life
In 2001, Parks married blues musician Paul Oscher; they divorced in 2010. By 2017 she married Christian Konopka, with whom she has a child.

Parks noted in an interview that her name is spelled with a "Z" as the result of a misprint early in her career:

<blockquote>When I was doing one of my first plays in the East Village, we had fliers printed up and they spelled my name wrong. I was devastated. But the director said, 'Just keep it, honey, and it will be fine.' And it was.

She teaches playwriting at Tisch School of the Arts in the Rita & Burton Goldberg Department of Dramatic Writing.

Notes

Further reading
Baym, Nina (ed.) "Suzan-Lori Parks."  In The Norton Anthology of American Literature, 6th edition, Vol. E. New York: W.W. Norton and Co., 2003: 2606–2607.
Collins, Ken and Victor Wishna. "Suzan-Lori Parks." In In Their Company: Portraits of American Playwrights. New York: Umbrage Editions, 2006: 186–189.
NPR interviews. "Suzan-Lori Parks".
"In Dialogue: The Imperceptible Mutabilities of Susan-Lori Parks in 365 Plays And As Many Days Across The Whole Kingdom" interview by Barbara Cassidy, The Brooklyn Rail, November 2006.
Geis, Deborah R. 2008. Suzan-Lori Parks. Ann Arbor: University of Michigan Press. 
Ghasemi, Mehdi. 2016. "Quest/ion of Identities in African American Feminist Postmodern Drama: A Study of Selected Plays by
Suzan-Lori Parks." Turku: Painosalama Oy. Accessed July 14, 2020. https://www.utupub.fi/bitstream/handle/10024/123601/AnnalesB419Ghasemi.pdf?sequence=4&isAllowed=y.
Marshal, John. 2003. "A Moment with Suzan-Lori Parks, Playwright." Seattle Post-Intelligencer (May 25). Accessed April 20, 2015. http://www.seattlepi.com/ae/books/article/A-momentwith-Suzan-Lori-Parks-playwright-1115418.php. 
Wetmore Jr., Kevin J. 2007. "It's an Oberammergau Thing: An Interview with Suzan-Lori Parks." In Suzan-Lori Parks: A Casebook, edited by Kevin J. Wetmore Jr. and Alycia Smith-Howard, 124–140. London and New York: Routledge,

External links

 
 
 
Suzan-Lori Parks - The Whiting FoundationSuzan-Lori Parks - Encyclopædia Britannica''
Voices from the Gaps Biography - University of Minnesota
Women of Color Women of Words Biography - Rutgers University
 Suzan-Lori Parks '85 Visits MHC (March 2007)

1963 births
Living people
21st-century American novelists
African-American dramatists and playwrights
African-American screenwriters
American women novelists
American screenwriters
African-American women writers
Writers from Kentucky
MacArthur Fellows
Writers from Massachusetts
Mount Holyoke College alumni
People from Harford County, Maryland
Postmodern theatre
Pulitzer Prize for Drama winners
American women dramatists and playwrights
American women screenwriters
20th-century American dramatists and playwrights
Postmodern writers
Tisch School of the Arts faculty
21st-century American women writers
20th-century American women writers
African-American novelists
African-American Catholics
Members of the American Academy of Arts and Letters